Frank Goodyear may refer to:

 Frank H. Goodyear (1849–1907), American businessman.
 Frank Goodyear (1936–1987), English classicist.

See also
Frank H. Goodyear (ship)